Chicano Art: Resistance and Affirmation (or CARA) was a traveling exhibit of Chicano/a artists which toured the United States from 1990 through 1993. CARA visited ten major cities and featured over 128 individual works by about 180 different Chicano/a artists. The show was also intended to visit Madrid and Mexico City. CARA was the first time a Chicano exhibit received major attention from the press and it was the first exhibit that collaborated between Chicanos and major museums in the U.S. The show was considered a "notable event in the development of Chicano art." Another unique feature of CARA was the "extensive planning" that attempted to be as inclusive as possible and which took place more than five years prior to the opening at Wight Art Gallery.

The final touring exhibit included paintings, murals and installations. Over forty murals were shown via slideshow. The first section of the show contained a short history of Chicanos going back to the pre-Columbian era, discussing the concept of Aztlán and including significant events up until 1965. The other areas of the exhibit were divided into themes that were representative of the Chicano movement: Feminist Visions, Reclaiming the Past, Regional Expressions and Redefining American Art. There were also three separate spaces devoted to the important Chicano collective arts movements, Asco, Los Four and the Royal Chicano Air Force. Uniquely, at the time for a museum show, the art was shown in context with the history and politics of the Chicano movement. In addition, the art shown in the exhibit was "created by Chicanos for other Chicanos."

CARA's name is also a play on words since the Spanish word for face is cara.

History 
The CARA exhibit was created through the joint actions of the Wight Art Gallery at the University of California, Los Angeles (UCLA) and the CARA National Advisory Committee. These two groups started planning in 1984, but the idea for the exhibit began in 1983, when Cecelia Klein, Shifra Goldman, and several graduate students (Maria de Herrera, Holly Barnet-Sanchez and Marcos Sanchez-Tranquilino) asked the new director of the Wight Art Gallery, Edith Tonelli, about creating a unique Chicano art exhibit. The Wight Art Gallery, with help from Klein and Goldman, applied for funds from the National Endowment for the Humanities (NEH). They were originally turned down because the word "Chicano" made some of the backers "uncomfortable." Other topics addressed by CARA, such as a critical stance on American cultural politics and the "myth of the melting pot" also intimidated the NEH. A second try for funds from the NEH took place in 1985 and the term Chicano was carefully explained and outlined. This time, after "considerable debate," funds were granted in 1986. The disbursement of funds took some time, however, because of controversy in Congress about censorship, funding the arts and the proposed defunding of programs. Eventually the Rockefeller Foundation stepped in and helped during the initial planning process and the implementation phases of the project.

The project rejected the conventional structure of having a single curator for the art and chose instead to collaborate on control of the art and administration. Those involved with the project were very careful to work with the Chicano community so that Chicanos could speak for themselves, rather than having an institution impose upon them. This later allowed the exhibit to become more than just an art show, but rather an "extension of the ongoing efforts of the Chicano Movement." To ensure that Chicano voices were heard, a large committee of over 40 Chicano scholars, artists and administrators was recruited and broken up into various committees to oversee, select, design and create regional task forces. An "ongoing process of negotiation" was status quo for the project.

The exhibit opened at Wight Art Gallery on September 9, 1990.

As the show toured, there were some unique ways to promote local interest. At the El Paso Museum of Art, there was a lowrider parade that initiated the opening of the show and in addition, there were several works in CARA that contained images of lowriders. The Albuquerque Museum of Art staged a lowrider car show on the opening day of the exhibit.

CARA closed after its last engagement, which was at the Museum of Art in San Antonio, Texas.

Reception 
There were large crowds at the exhibition in every city.

CARA challenged many art critics to look beyond what had been considered "mainstream" or "traditional" fine art. The exhibition was successful in bringing new ideas to viewers. It also challenged viewers and critics alike to see value in the intersection of politics and art. The art was considered "complex" and "contentious" and also having a "vibrant agenda." Some critics, in fact, conflated the politics of the art to such a degree that they felt the show was not about the art at all, but instead only about the message. Other critics seemed uncomfortable with the art they were viewing.

For Chicanos/as themselves, it was exciting and moving to see their own lives, culture, ideas and struggles reflected in art. Many viewers and critics expressed the feeling that "at long last Chicanos could see themselves reflected and represented...a process of both aesthetic and political validation." The exhibition inspired many young Latino people to look into their own genealogy and appreciate their Chicano roots. CARA taught many non-Latino Americans about Chicano life, history, ideology and culture. CARA also helped those in the U.S. learn to appreciate the nuanced differences between "Hispanic" and "Chicano."

Legacy 
CARA challenged the mainstream art world to view Chicano art as an important art movement that stands on equal footing with other well-recognized art movements. CARA also established Chicano art as something other than a "subculture" though it was often feared that the Chicano art was displayed in an academic way that would "erode" or destroy the true meaning of the art. Nevertheless, the subject matter of CARA stretched the boundaries of what traditionally could or should be shown in a museum setting. The exhibition also succeeded at "imploding myths and stereotypes that said Chicanos had no image-making lineage, or that their work could not compete aesthetically, technically, or conceptually on a national and international level."

CARA was the first exhibition of its type and set a standard for curatorial practices surrounding Chicano art and exhibits. CARA would later be used as a "template" for creating other exhibits with Chicano artists.

CARA also helped raise awareness that museums should learn to have a "close working relationship with the communities they represent," which means that there should be more diversity in the artwork shown by these organizations. In addition to working with the community to represent more diversity, it also exposed other issues, such as corporate sponsorship in museums. CARA also clearly demonstrated that there was still a critical bias towards men being represented more often than women in museums and in the arts.

Artists who showed work with CARA, like Gaspar Enriquez, found that more of their art started selling as it gained more exposure in different markets. Not all artists found themselves in the same situation, but for many, doors were opened in mainstream markets, collections, lecture circuits and museums.

CARA also filled a void that was left when many Chicano art collectives began to break down.

Artists and venues

Artists

Venues 
 Wight Art Gallery at University of California, Los Angeles
 San Francisco Museum of Modern Art
 Fresno Art Museum
 Tucson Museum of Art
 Denver Art Museum
 Albuquerque Museum of Art and History
 National Museum of American Art, Washington, DC
 Bronx Museum of the Arts
 El Paso Museum of Art
 San Antonio Museum of Art

Quotes 
"We made valiant efforts to things through--every one of these sessions became a philosophical discussion...In fact, I feel like I've been through an incredible course in Chicanismo."—Judith Baca

"I loved this exhibit. It's like looking in a mirror. It's really seeing the heart of my people."—Anonymous

Read More

References 

Mexican American
Mexican-American culture
Chicano art